The Wetterstein Formation is a regional geologic formation of the Northern Limestone Alps and Western Carpathians extending from southern Bavaria, Germany in the west, through northern Austria to northern Hungary and western Slovakia in the east. The formation dates back to the Ladinian to Carnian stages of the Late Triassic. The formation is named after the Wetterstein Mountains in southern Germany and northwestern Austria. The center of its distribution, however, is in the Karwendel Mountains. It occurs in the Northern and Southern Limestone Alps and in the Western Carpathians.

The formation is composed of mostly reefal limestones and dolomites, the latter the result of widespread diagenesis. In many areas there is a frequent alternation of limestone and dolomite facies. Local variants to indicate the Wetterstein Formation include  (Wetterstein Limestone), Wettersteindolomit ("Wetterstein Dolomite") and combinations thereof. It belongs to the tectonostratigraphical unit Austroalpine nappes. The carbonate rock of the formation is from the Middle Triassic epoch of the Ladinian stage, comparable to the German stage in which Muschelkalk rock strata were formed.

The formation has provided numerous fossils of corals, sponges, bivalves, gastropods and other marine groups indicative of a shallow marine carbonate platform environment deposited at the northern end of the Tethys Ocean.

Naming 

The Wetterstein Formation is named after the Wetterstein Mountains in southern Germany and northwestern Austria.

Alternative names for the whole formation or parts of it in stratigraphical (vertical) or facies (lateral) sense are:
 Wetterstein Limestone (Wettersteinkalk)
 Wettersteinkalk Formation
 Wettersteindolomit - used in Semmering and Kalkkögel, Austria
 Wetterstein Limestone Formation
 Wetterstein kalk/dolomit - used in the Northern Limestone Alps of Austria
 Wetterstein reef limestone Formation

The Swiss stratigraphical lexicon uses Wetterstein Formation as "informal, but used name" with the following historical variants:
 Wettersteinkalk (von Guembel 1861, Fraas 1910)
 Wettersteinkalk = Ladinische Stufe (Cornelius 1935)
 Wetterstein = Wettersteindolomit = Wettersteinkomplex (Stöcklin 1949) (Fellerer 1964, Kraus 1964)
 Calcaire de Wetterstein [sic] = Calcaire du Wetterstein = Formation de Wetterstein [sic] (Hirsch 1966)
 Wettersteindolomit, Wetterstein-Dolomit

Subunits
Its subunits include: 
Messerstich Limestone
Schlern Dolomite
Marmolata Limestone
Steinalm Formation
Ramsau Dolomite Formation

Description 

Extent 

The formation crops out to the north of the Hohe Tauern window and is part of the Austroalpine nappes.

Stratigraphy 
In the Semmering area of Austria, where the name Wettersteindolomit is used, the formation is unconformably overlain by the Kapellener Shale and overlies the Reifling Formation, in the Kalkkögel and Radstadt Tauern the dolomite overlies the Partnach Formation and is overlain by the Raibl Formation, while in Tyrol the formation, called Wettersteinkalk/dolomit unconformably overlies the Gutenstein and Steinalm Formations and unconformably underlies the Reingraben Formation.

In the Aggtelek-Rudabánya mountains of Hungary, the formation, called Wetterstein Limestone Formation overlies the Reifling and Steinalm Formations and is overlain by the Szádvárborsa Formation.

Regional correlations 
In Austria the Wetterstein Dolomite correlates with the Alberg Formation of the Linz Dolomites, the Wetterstein kalk/dolomite with the lower part of the Hallstatt Formation of the Northern Limestone Alps and with the Schlern Dolomite, or Schlern Formation, in the Southern Limestone Alps.

In Hungary, the formation is time-equivalent with the Berva Formation of the Bükk, the Bódvavölgyi Ophiolite, Szentjánoshegy and Derenk Formations of the Aggtelek-Rudabánya range and the Csanádapáca Formation of the Békés Zone. In the Dinarides, the formation is time-equivalent with the Grivska Formation of Bosnia. The Kopaonik Formation in its eponymous mountain range in Serbia is considered a distal, more deep water equivalent of the Wetterstein platform sediments.

Diagenesis 
Dolomitization of the Wetterstein Carbonate Platform is a widespread phenomenon, especially in the Tirolic units of the Northern Calcareous Alps. At the Clessinsperre, the type locality for the underlying Steinalm Formation, intense dolomitization has altered the microfacies characteristics of the Wetterstein Carbonate platform – typical are fore-reef carbonates, later reefal and back-reefal carbonates topped by lagoonal carbonates, making the original features hardly visible.

Fossil content 
Because, during dolomitisation, traces of fossils are largely lost as a result of recrystallisation, fossils in the Wetterstein dolomite are harder to distinguish, and even in thin sections may be barely recognizable. Wetterstein dolomite is rarely as bituminous as typical Main Dolomite and therefore tends to be much more pure and brighter-coloured. Otherwise, there are no fundamental differences with the Wetterstein limestone.

Among others, the following fossils have been described from the Wetterstein Formation:

See also 
 Geology of the Alps
 Schrattenkalk Formation
 Hauptdolomit Formation
 List of types of limestone
 
 Ansbachersandstein, contemporaneous ichnofossiliferous formation of Bavaria
 Benkersandstein, contemporaneous ichnofossiliferous formation of Bavaria
 Chañares Formation, fossiliferous formation of the Ischigualasto-Villa Unión Basin, Argentina
 Candelária Formation, contemporaneous fossiliferous formation of the Paraná Basin, Brazil
 Molteno Formation, contemporaneous fossiliferous formation of Lesotho and South Africa
 Pebbly Arkose Formation, contemporaneous fossiliferous formation of Botswana, Zambia and Zimbabwe
 Denmark Hill Insect Bed, contemporaneous fossiliferous unit of Queensland, Australia
 Madygen Formation, contemporaneous Lagerstätte of Kyrgyzstan

References

Bibliography

Further reading

External links 
 World map at the time of the Early/Lower Triassic
 Cephalopod coquina beds in the Wetterstein Limestone

Geologic formations of Austria
Geologic formations of Germany
Geologic formations of Hungary
Geologic formations of Slovakia
Geologic formations of Switzerland
Triassic System of Europe
Triassic Austria
Triassic Germany
Carnian Stage
Ladinian Stage
Limestone formations
Dolomite formations
Reef deposits
Fossiliferous stratigraphic units of Europe
Geology of the Alps
Limestone Alps
Northern Limestone Alps
Southern Limestone Alps